The 1961 Bowling Green Falcons football team was an American football team that represented Bowling Green State University in the Mid-American Conference (MAC) during the 1961 NCAA University Division football season. In their seventh season under head coach Doyt Perry, the Falcons compiled an 8–2 record (5–1 against MAC opponents), won the MAC championship, and outscored opponents by a combined total of 194 to 78.

On November 23, 1961, Bowling Green concluded its season with a 36–6 loss to Fresno State in the Mercy Bowl at the Los Angeles Memorial Coliseum.  The game was Bowling Green's first bowl appearance. The game was a fundraiser for the families of members of the Cal Poly Mustangs football team who died in a C-46 plane crash while returning home after a game at Bowling Green on October 29, 1960.

Schedule

References

Bowling Green
Bowling Green Falcons football seasons
Mid-American Conference football champion seasons
Bowling Green Falcons football